John Ruane (born 1952) is an Australian film director.

Select Credits
Queensland (1976)
Coming of Age (1984) - cinematographer
Hanging Together (1985) (TV movie)
Feathers (1987)
Death in Brunswick (1991)
That Eye, the Sky (1994)
Dead Letter Office (1998)
The Love of Lionel's Life (2000) (TV movie)

References

External links

1952 births
Living people
Australian film directors